Sergey or Sergei Chernyshev may refer to: 
 Sergey Chernyshev (footballer)
 Sergei Chernyshev (breakdancer)
 Sergey Chernyshev (rugby union)